The 1 February 2008 Baghdad bombings occurred on 1 February 2008, when two suicide bombings occurred in Baghdad, the capital of Iraq. The blasts killed 98 people and injured over 200 others.

Details 

The two blasts were shortly before the call to Friday prayers when many Iraqis were shopping or meeting with friends.

Initial reports were that both women had Down Syndrome, based on the analysis of their intact heads. But later reports were less clear on the issue, saying that the women had depression and schizophrenia and it was unknown whether they had a condition that made them unable to understand what they were doing.

The acting director of the al-Rashad psychiatric hospital, Dr. Sahi Aboub, was arrested in connection with the attack on 10 February. It has been reported

that Dr Aboub is a Shia Muslim and that the al Rashad hospital is run by the Shia Mehdi Army. However, the attacks occurred in primarily Shia areas of Baghdad.

Reactions
 : Prime Minister Nouri Maliki said the use of disabled people underlined the "terrorists' moral degradation".

References

External links
 BBC News: In pictures: Baghdad market blasts
 BBC News: Eyewitness: Iraqi markets blown to bits

2008 murders in Iraq
Suicide bombings in Baghdad
Mass murder in 2008
Baghdad bombings, 1 February
2000s in Baghdad
Violence against Shia Muslims in Iraq
Terrorist incidents in Baghdad
February 2008 events in Iraq
February 2008 crimes